(she also goes by the pseudonym ) is a Japanese singer and composer from Ibaraki prefecture in Japan. Itō has composed the soundtracks to many anime television shows and is part of the bands Oranges & Lemons and Heart of Air.

Discography

Solo works

Singles 
 2001-12-29: "Hitomi no Naka ni" — PS game Sister Princess: Pure Stories theme song)
 2003-04-23: "Yasashii Ai no Hane/Nemunemu Tenshi" — anime television series Angel Tales opening & ending theme)
 2004-05-26: "Futari Dakara" — anime television series Koi Kaze ending theme
 2005-06-29: "Shōnen Humming" — anime television series Absolute Boy ending theme

Albums 
 1997-06-21: Waste days [From METAL BLACK -The First-]
 1998-10-11: Door: Drifting Souls
 2001-11-07: Hana no Oto
 2003-12-26: Yumefuru Mori e
 2004-07-22: Harmonies of heaven
 2012-16-12: Wonder wonderful

Other 
 2001-05-23: anime television series Gyoten ningen batseelor theme song single – ending theme "Mahō no Kotoba"
 2003-12-26: PS2 game Primopuel: Oshaberi Heartner theme song single — image song "Otsukisama to Rururu"
 2006-09-06: PS2 game Binchotan: Shiawase-goyomi theme song single – ending theme "Ashita no Hanakago"

Group works

Heart of Air 
 2001-03-07: Kiss Me Sunlights — PS2 game ZOE opening theme
 2001-06-27: Ring on the World — anime television series Z.O.E Dolores,i ending theme
 2002-11-22: Blue Flow — anime television series Haibane Renmei ending theme

Masumi Ito and Yoko Ueno 
 2003-02-05: Haibane Renmei Image Album: Seinaru Doukei
 2003-05-21: Daichi no la-li-la — anime television series Scrapped Princess ending theme

Mariaria 
 2006-05-10: Aru Hi no Kamisama — includes anime television series Nishi no Yoki Majo: Astraea Testament ending theme "Kanata"

Soundtracks

TV animation 
 Space Pirate Mito series (1999)
 Super Gals! Kotobuki Ran (2001)
 Z.O.E. Dolores,i (2001)
 Galaxy Angel series (2001, 2002, 2003, 2004)
 Magical Nyan Nyan Taruto (2001)
 Pita-Ten (2002)
 Azumanga Daioh (2002 – song performance & composition for character songs only)
 Chōjūshin Gravion series (2002, 2004)
 Scrapped Princess (2003)
 Da Capo (2003 – with Yugo Kanno)
 Chrono Crusade (2003)
 Absolute Boy (2005)
 D.C.S.S.: Da Capo Second Season (2005)
 Gunparade Orchestra (2005 – with Masayoshi Yoshikawa)
 Noein: Mou Hitori no Kimi e (2005)
 Kagihime Monogatari Eikyū Alice Rondo (2006)
 Tactical Roar (2006)
 Nishi no Yoki Majo: Astraea Testament (2006)
 Koisuru Tenshi Angelique series (2006, 2007)
 Gift: Eternal Rainbow (2006)
 Venus Versus Virus (2007)
 Shinkyoku Sōkai Polyphonica (2007)
 KimiKiss pure rouge (2007 – with Yokoyama Masaru & Iwadare Noriyuki)
 Shigofumi (2008)
 Phantom: Requiem for the Phantom (2009)
 Canaan (2009)
 Infinite Stratos (2011)
 Hiiro no Kakera (2012)
 Jinrui wa Suitaishimashita (2012)
 Beyond the Boundary (2013)
 RDG: Red Data Girl (2013) (with Myu)
 She and Her Cat: Everything Flows (2016) (part of TO-MAS Soundsight Fluorescent Forest with Yohei Matsui and Mito)
 Flip Flappers (2016) (part of TO-MAS Soundsight Fluorescent Forest)
 Alice & Zouroku (2017) (part of TO-MAS)
 Miss Kobayashi's Dragon Maid (2017)

Original video animation (OVA) 
 Angelique: Shiroi Tsubasa no Memoir (2000)
 Angel Sanctuary (2000)
 éX-Driver (2000)
 Angelique: Seichi yori Ai o Komete (2001)
 ZOE: 2167 IDOLO (2001)
 Ichigo 100% (2004, 2005)
 Book Girl OVA series (2009–2010)

Movie 
 éX-Drive The Movie (2002)
 Book Girl (2010)
 Broken Blade (2010 – 2011: opening theme song arrangement with Kokia)
 Beyond the Boundary -I'LL BE HERE- Past (2015)
 Beyond the Boundary -I'LL BE HERE- Future (2015)

References

External links 
  
 Masumi Ito and Hikaru Nanase at Media Arts Database 
 Masumi Ito and Hikaru Nanase profiles at Oricon 
 
 
 

Year of birth missing (living people)
Anime composers
Anime singers
Japanese film score composers
Japanese music arrangers
Japanese women film score composers
Japanese women singers
Living people
Musicians from Ibaraki Prefecture